This is a list of terrorist incidents in India. In July 2016, the Government of India released data on a string of terror strikes in India since 2005 that claimed 707 lives and left over 3,200 injured.



List of Terror Attacks in India

Year, fatalities, and number of incidents

See also
 Terrorism in India
 Insurgency in Jammu and Kashmir
 Insurgency in Northeast India
 Insurgency in Punjab
 Naxalite–Maoist insurgency

References

External links
South Asia Terrorism Portal

Terrorist incidents
Terrorist incidents
Terrorist incidents
India